Richard Paul Macphail (born 17 September 1950, in Bedford, Bedfordshire) is an English musician, road manager, and business owner best known for his relationship with the rock band Genesis from their formation in 1967 to 1973.

Genesis
Macphail was the vocalist for Anon, one of the two bands formed at Charterhouse School in Godalming, Surrey, the other being Garden Wall. In 1967, members of the two groups formed the first line-up of Genesis. Macphail then joined The Austin Hippy Blues which also featured Harry Williamson, who later wrote and performed music with Macphail's old bandmate and original Genesis guitarist Anthony Phillips. Once this band had dissolved, Macphail's next musical venture was tour manager for Genesis from 1969 until 1973. He is credited as "sound friend" on the liner notes to their fourth album Foxtrot (1972), and the band dedicated their first live album, Genesis Live (1973), to him.

Macphail worked with Genesis once more in 1976 for their A Trick of the Tail Tour, and with former Genesis singer Peter Gabriel as tour manager in 1977 and 1978.

Other projects
Macphail ended his musical career with a band called Legion in 1981, which featured him as lead vocalist. Legion had played a short 4 date tour that year supporting American band, Spirit, which included a gig at Friars in Aylesbury which was opened by another band, Marillion. 

In 2016, Macphail enjoyed a short spell as DJ on Meridian Radio in London, and followed this up with his own on-line radio station Radio Rich Pickings.

Outside of music, Macphail has worked with environmental and ecological organizations, including Gentle Ghost. Now semi-retired, he successfully ran his own energy advice company from the beginning of the 1980s. Macphail still makes the occasional appearance at Genesis conventions and the like.

A book on Macphail's time with Genesis, titled My Book of Genesis, was released in 2017 with co-author Chris Charlesworth.

See also 
 Genesis (band)

References

Living people
1950 births
People from Bedford
People educated at Charterhouse School